Kausha Rach (born 15 August 1982) is an Indian Telugu-language film actress. 

She has acted in various Telugu films including Premaya Namaha, Kuberulu,, Bhagavantudu, Prarambham, Athili Sattibabu LKG, Gautama Buddha and Yashodhara.

Filmography
 Manmadhudu (2002)
 Premaya Namaha
 Alex
 Dil (2003)
 Utsaham
 Kuberulu
 Bhagavantudu
 Prarambham
 Raraju (2006)
 Athili Sattibabu LKG (2007)
 Mantra (2007)
 Gautama Buddha (2007)
 Blade Babji (2008)
 Indumathi
 Nenu Meeku Telusa (2008)
 Ninaithale Inikkum (2009)
 Siddhu +2 (2009)
 Broker (2010)
 Kireetam
 N.H-5 (2010) 
 Arjunudu (2010) (Filming)
 Mahankali (2012) (Filming)
 Dr. Paramanandayya's Students Gang (2012)

References

External links
 

21st-century Indian actresses
Indian film actresses
Living people
1986 births